Samuel Zenas Ammen (1843–1929) was an American Confederate veteran and journalist. He is known as the 'Practical Founder' of the Kappa Alpha Order. He was the literary editor of The Baltimore Sun and author of three books.

Early life
Samuel Zenas Ammen was born on October 23, 1843, in Fincastle, Virginia. Benjamin Ammen was his father and Naomi (Cross) Ammen was his mother.

During the American Civil War of 1861–1865, Ammen served in the Confederate States Army. He enlisted in Company D ("Finchester Rifles") of the 11th Virginia Infantry on August 31, 1861, for 1 year of service and was discharged May 15, 1863, or May 18, 1862. He then served with Captain William Andrew McCue's Fincastle Cavalry Company, Burks' Regiment Virginia Local Defense to do cavalry service with the Confederate Home Guard in Botetourt County.

Following the war, Ammen attended Washington College in Lexington, Virginia, where Confederate General Robert E. Lee was President. While there, he founded the Kappa Alpha Order. He designed its ritual, accolade and prayer. He served as its second Knight Commander after John Francis Rogers for six terms. During his tenure, he helped establish twenty-two active chapters and four alumni chapters.

Career

Ammen became the literary editor of The Baltimore Sun from 1881 to 1911. He was also the author of three books.

Death
Ammen died on January 5, 1929, in Daytona Beach, Florida. He was buried at the Oak Grove Cemetery in Lexington, Virginia.

Bibliography

History of Maryland Commands in the Confederate Service.

Further reading

References

1843 births
1929 deaths
Editors of Maryland newspapers
People from Fincastle, Virginia
People from Daytona Beach, Florida
Washington and Lee University alumni
Confederate States Army soldiers
American male journalists
People of Virginia in the American Civil War
The Baltimore Sun people
Kappa Alpha Order
College fraternity founders
Journalists from Virginia